Nail Khamatkhasanovich Galimov (born 6 March 1966) is a Russian professional football coach and a former player. He also holds Tajikistani citizenship.

Club career
He is the all-time second best scorer of the Russian First Division with 127 goals, behind Yevgeni Alkhimov.

External links
 

1966 births
People from Sughd Region
Living people
Soviet footballers
Russian footballers
Tajikistani footballers
Association football forwards
FC Luch Vladivostok players
Russian Premier League players
Soviet expatriate footballers
Russian expatriate footballers
Russian expatriate sportspeople in Poland
Expatriate footballers in Poland
Russian football managers
FC Chita players